The 2021 Fr8Auctions 200 was the 4th stock car race of the 2021 NASCAR Camping World Truck Series season, and the 16th iteration of the event. The race was held on Saturday, March 20, 2021 in Hampton, Georgia at Atlanta Motor Speedway, a  permanent quad-oval in a doubleheader with the NASCAR Xfinity Series with the 2021 EchoPark 250. The race would take 130 laps to complete. Kyle Busch, driving for his own team Kyle Busch Motorsports, would win the race in dominating fashion to win his 60th ever NASCAR Camping World Truck Series race. Austin Hill of Hattori Racing Enterprises and John Hunter Nemechek of Kyle Busch Motorsports would garner the rest of the podium positions, finishing 2nd and 3rd, respectively.

Entrepreneur and CEO of Camping World Marcus Lemonis would once again announce his challenge for the race, this time with Overton's sponsoring any unsponsored car. 11 cars would take the sponsorship.

Driver Bill Lester, now 60 years old, last racing in the 2006 NASCAR Craftsman Truck Series, would return after 15 years of absence, running the race as a one-off event.

Background 

Atlanta Motor Speedway (formerly Atlanta International Raceway) is a track in Hampton, Georgia, 20 miles (32 km) south of Atlanta. It is a 1.54-mile (2.48 km) quad-oval track with a seating capacity of 111,000. It opened in 1960 as a 1.5-mile (2.4 km) standard oval. In 1994, 46 condominiums were built over the northeastern side of the track. In 1997, to standardize the track with Speedway Motorsports' other two 1.5-mile (2.4 km) ovals, the entire track was almost completely rebuilt. The frontstretch and backstretch were swapped, and the configuration of the track was changed from oval to quad-oval. The project made the track one of the fastest on the NASCAR circuit.

Entry list 

*Driver would change to Josh Berry, due to the fact that Kris Wright had tested positive for COVID-19 during the week.

Starting lineup 
The starting lineup was based on a formula based on the previous race, the 2021 Bucked Up 200. As a result, John Hunter Nemechek of Kyle Busch Motorsports would win the pole.

Race results 
Stage 1 Laps: 40

Stage 2 Laps: 40

Stage 3 Laps: 50

References 

2021 NASCAR Camping World Truck Series
NASCAR races at Atlanta Motor Speedway
Fr8Auctions 200
Fr8Auctions 200